William Edward Drevlow (January 23, 1890 – August 20, 1975) was a Democratic politician from Idaho. He was a native of Minnesota. He served as the 31st lieutenant governor of Idaho from 1959 to 1967 during the administration of Governor Robert E. Smylie.

He died of pneumonia and internal bleeding in 1975.

References

Idaho Democrats
Lieutenant Governors of Idaho
1890 births
1975 deaths
20th-century American politicians
Deaths from pneumonia in Idaho